Karadaiyan Nonbu is a festival performed by women from the Tamil Hindu community for the welfare of their husbands as well as future husbands. This is in relation to how Savithri saved her husband from Yamadharma Raja. It is celebrated on the first day of Panguni in the southern calendar.

Legend & Celebration
Historically, married women prayed to the Hindu goddess Gowri and prayed for longevity and well-being of their respective husbands. Women try to echo the devotion and love shown by Savitri for her husband Satyavan, as seen in the tale of Savitri and Satyavan, told in the epic Mahabharata. Married women fast on that day. Before the auspicious time, women draw kolam in front of their pooja room, take a bath and officiate the ceremony with the pooja. Typically, an offering made out of rice powder and jaggery is prepared and offered to the goddess. It is said that Savitri's devotion towards the goddess Gowri gave her the strength and wisdom to win back her husband's life from lord Yama, the Lord of death. She won the battle not by arms or ammunition, but by her clever arguments. When Yama offered her a wish, she prayed for a thousand sons. After he agreed, Savitri sought the life of her dead husband back to fulfill this wish.

Preparation of adai
Bhog is a special adai prepared out of rice flour, black eyed peas, jaggery and coconut. It is eaten hot and with butter.

References

Indian cuisine
Goddesses
Coconuts
Butter